The Toyota Camry (Japanese: トヨタ・カムリ Toyota Kamuri) is an automobile sold internationally by the Japanese auto manufacturer Toyota since 1982, spanning multiple generations. Originally compact in size (narrow-body), the Camry has grown since the 1990s to fit the mid-size classification (wide-body)—although the two widths co-existed in that decade. Since the release of the wide-bodied versions, Camry has been extolled by Toyota as the firm's second "world car" after the Corolla. , the Camry is positioned above the Corolla and below the Avalon or Crown in several markets.

In Japan, Camry was once exclusive to Toyota Corolla Store retail dealerships. Narrow-body cars also spawned a rebadged sibling in Japan, the Toyota Vista (トヨタ・ビスタ)—also introduced in 1982 and sold at Toyota Vista Store locations. Diesel fuel versions have previously retailed at Toyota Diesel Store. The Vista Ardeo was a wagon version of the Vista V50.

Between 1979 and 1982, the Camry nameplate was delegated to a four-door sedan model in Japan, known as the Celica Camry. When Camry became an independent model line in 1982 with the V10 series, Toyota made it available as a five-door liftback in addition to the sedan. The subsequent Camry V20 series, debuted in 1986 with a station wagon substituting the liftback body variant and Japan-only hardtop sedans making their debut. The company replaced the V20 in 1990 with the V30 sedan and hardtop, but this model series was exclusive to Japan. Automotive tax regulations in that country dictated the retention of a narrower body as used in previous Camry generations. However, overseas demand for a larger Camry resulted in the development of a wide-body XV10 sedan and station wagon that arrived in 1991. Japan also received the wider XV10 as the Toyota Scepter (トヨタ・セプター). The company then issued an XV10-bodied coupé in 1993 that was spun off in 1998 as an independent model line, titled Camry Solara.

When the Japanese market received a new narrow-body V40 series in 1994 to replace V30, the wide-body XV10 continued unchanged. Its replacement, the XV20, arrived in 1996—named Camry Gracia in Japan. It was not until the narrow V40 ended manufacture in 1998 that the Camry in Japan was to again mirror the cars sold internationally. Japanese sedans dropped the Gracia suffix in 1999, although it was retained by the wagon until its 2001 demise. From 1998, the Vista ended its Camry alignment, and instead branched into an independent model line with the V50 series for an extra generation before the nameplate was withdrawn in 2003.

The next wide-body model, the XV30, came in 2001. Now sold only as a sedan, it now offered two different front- and rear-end design treatments. Japan and most global markets received one style; a separate, more conservative version covered markets in East and Southeast Asia. With the XV40 of 2006, the Camry-derived Aurion become the donor model for the more conservative Camry sold in this region. The subsequent XV50 series, sold from 2011 until 2019, has resulted in even more markets adopting the alternative body panels, such as Japan and Eastern Europe. The current generation is called the XV70.

When Toyota launched their luxury Lexus brand in 1989, it offered a close derivative of the Camry/Vista hardtop sedan as the Lexus ES. The relationship continues to this day, but over the generations, the ES—sold as the Toyota Windom in Japan from 1991 through to 2005—gravitated further away from its Camry brethren. Between 2000 and 2010 and since 2012, Daihatsu has offered a badge engineered Camry as the Daihatsu Altis (ダイハツ・アルティス) sold only in Japan. Badge engineering has also occurred in Australia with the Holden Apollo between 1989 and 1996. From 1993, Toyota Australia badged V6-engined versions as Camry Vienta, becoming Toyota Vienta in 1995 until the badge's departure in 2000. Between 2006 and 2017, the Toyota Aurion model from Australia was derived from the V6 Camry, but with revised front-end and rear-end styling treatment and a partially refurbished cabin.

Etymology 
The name "Camry" derives from the Japanese word  (:ja:冠, かんむり), meaning "crown". This follows Toyota's naming tradition of using the crown name for primary models starting with the Toyota Crown (1955), continuing with the Toyota Corona (1957) and Corolla (1966); the Latin words for "crown" and "small crown", respectively. Maintaining this theme was the Toyota Tiara (1960) named after the "tiara" form of crown. The Atara trim level name used on the Camry in Australia since 2011 means "crown" in Hebrew. The rebadged Camry variant for Japan, the Toyota Scepter (1991)—took its name from "scepter", a royal accessory to a crown.

Timeline

Narrow-body

Celica Camry (A40/A50; 1979–1982) 

The "Camry" nameplate originated on a four-door sedan approximate to the Toyota Celica called the Celica Camry. Toyota designated this initial application of the Camry name as the A40/A50 series. Celica Camry made its sales debut in January 1980 at Toyota Corolla Store retail dealerships in Japan. Production had earlier commenced in December 1979 at the Tsutsumi plant at Toyota, Aichi. Despite the marketing position, Celica Camry shares few components with its namesake—but rather the Carina (A40/A50). Toyota modified the Carina by elongating its front-end and incorporating styling cues such as the T-bar grille motif that resembled the Celica XX/Supra (A40). Strictly speaking, Celica Camry is not the first generation of Camry, but rather its predecessor.

Celica Camry uses the front-engine, rear-wheel-drive layout and in A40 guise, a standard four-link rigid axle suspension system with gasoline inline-four engines displacing 1.6 liters for the 12T-U (TA41) and 1.8 liters with the 13T-U (TA46). Initial model grades comprised: 1600 LT, 1600 XT, 1800 LT, 1800 XT, and 1800 XT Super Edition. In August 1980, Toyota released high-end models with four-wheel independent suspension, denoted A50 (front MacPherson struts, rear semi-trailing arm setup; four-wheel disc brakes). For the TA57 series 1800 SX, Toyota fitted the 1.8-liter 3T-EU engine. Toyota designated the new 2.0-liter grades, the 21R-U powered 2000 SE and 18R-GEU-based 2000 GT as RA56 and RA55, respectively.

V10 (1982–1986) 

Toyota started production of the first generation series Camry in March 1982 at the Tsutsumi plant. Designated the model code V10, when fitted with S-series gasoline engines it was known as the SV10, SV11, or SV12 depending on the exact version. Likewise, the C-series diesel versions are identified by the CV10 and CV11 codes. Released to the Japanese market on 24 March 1982, Toyota issued the V10 series as a four-door notchback sedan retailing at the Toyota Corolla Store dealerships. At the same time, a twinned model—the Toyota Vista—launched as a rebadged Camry sold at separate Toyota Vista Store locations. Five-door liftback versions of the Vista came to the market in August 1982, although outside of export markets the Camry remained exclusively a sedan. These cars served above the comparably sized Toyota Carina and Corona in the Toyota hierarchy. Unlike the preceding Celica Camry, exports were achieved with the first generation Camry to Australia, Europe and North America.

Development of the V10 series Camry and Vista began in August 1977 following the 1973 oil crisis and would later cover the 1979 crisis. Automobile manufacturers were making the inexorable move to downsized, lighter, more fuel efficient cars with better aerodynamic performance. The industry also began wide-scale switching from the rear-wheel-drive layout to the lighter and more compact front-wheel-drive in the interest of increased fuel economy. With a development focus on exports, particularly to the US, Toyota designed Camry to replace the Toyota Corona (T130) in many overseas markets. It needed to compete with the compact, front-drive Honda Accord sedan from Japan. The design brief also established the compact front-wheel-drive X platform vehicles by General Motors in the US as competitors. In light of this competition—and a first for Toyota—the V10 adopted front-wheel drive with the engine transversely mounted. Between this layout that reduced the size of the engine compartment, the notchback sedan and liftback bodies with rear quarter windows, and the longer wheelbase of —the V10 series was considered spacious for its time and class. Furthermore, by situating the fuel tank underneath the back seat, luggage space is increased. The styling of the V10 followed the box-shaped trends characteristic of the early 1980s. Wind tunnel testing led to the fitment of drag-reducing flush pillars, a flat roofline to reduce wind buffeting, and one-piece front bumper with air dam to direct air flow.

Coil spring independent suspension features by way of a MacPherson strut type with stabilizer and strut bar up front, and a MacPherson rear setup with parallel lower arms. Steering uses a rack and pinion design; braking hardware is made up of front ventilated discs and rear drums with a double proportioning valve to suppress lock-up. Innovatively, a sensor is fitted to detect worn-out brake pads, alerted by use of an audible chime.

Powertrain design was reassessed for front-wheel-drive and this generated a foundation for which other models were developed. The transaxle is connected inline with the engine, and to create a simple and compact structure, a single rail system that replaces the three shafts normally used for each gear range with a single shaft, was adopted. In addition, automatic transmission fluid was used for the lubricating oil in order to reduce friction. Existing gasoline S- and diesel C-series engines were converted for use in transverse applications. From July 1982, four-speed automatic with overdrive became available after starting manufacture the previous month. The 2.0-liter 2S-ELU engine with  an improved S51 five-speed manual transmission and four-speed automatic followed in August. August 1983 saw the 1.8-liter 1C-TL turbocharged diesel offered exclusive to Japanese dealerships called Toyota Diesel Store. June 1984 introduced the twin-cam 2.0-liter 3S-GELU engine offered on higher trims with  depending on the version. For lower trims, the  "Ci" 1.8-liter 1S-iLU arrived. The diesel was upgraded to the 2.0-liter 2C-TL specification in August 1985.

Japanese trims levels initially comprised LT, XT, SE, and ZX for Camry sedan. Lumiere and XE grades came to the market in June 1984, and the GLi TwinCam in May 1985. Vista sedan and liftback specification levels were at first VC (sedan only), VL, VE, and VX. The VF arrived in August 1982, and VR and VS models in June 1984 at the expense of the departing VE. Special edition models comprised: VE Extra (December 1982), VL Extra (January 1983), VL Super Extra (January 1985), VF-II (April 1985 and April 1986), and VL Grand Extra (December 1985 and April 1986). Wing mirrors became door-mounted as opposed to fender-mounted in May 1983. Facelifted models arrived in June 1984 featuring a new grille, redesigned bumpers, revised tail-lamps, updated dashboard, enlarged glovebox, and general trim alterations.

The shift to smaller cars amid the oil crises doubled Japanese automobile market share from 10 to 20 percent in the United States between 1970 and 1980; thus, causing economic tensions between the two nations. Toyota then began investigating the option of building a US production facility, following the announcements in January and April 1980 by Honda and Nissan, respectively, to manufacture automobiles locally. As investigations proceeded, Toyota proposed entering a joint venture with Ford in May 1980 to produce a compact car. Toyota advocated that its Camry be manufactured at a Ford factory and sold through the sales channels of both brands, but Ford deemed Camry to be in competition with a model it was developing, which became the Ford Tempo, leading to an impasse and then the cessation of negotiations in July 1981. Increasing Japan–United States unease culminated with the Japanese government, at the urging of its US counterpart, imposing a voluntary cartel in May 1981 with a threshold for the export of motor vehicles to the US. Toyota would eventually pursue circumvention; firstly by entering into venture by forming NUMMI with General Motors in 1984 to manufacture the Toyota Corolla, and then by setting up its own facility at Georgetown, Kentucky in 1988 for the next generation Camry.

Sales of the V10 Camry in the US began in March 1983 after exports commenced in January, and by 1985 it had sold 128,000 units. Unlike other markets, federalized quad headlamps were fitted for the 1983 and 1984 model years. Toyota then offered DX (deluxe) and LE (luxury edition) trim levels, the latter adding standard features such as body-colored bumpers, tachometer, tilt steering wheel, upgraded stereo, electric mirrors and variable intermittent windscreen wipers. Updates for the 1984 model year included an overdrive lockout switch for the automatic transmission. Changes for 1985 involved the facelift (now with one-piece headlamps), the transfer of the optional cruise control's switchgear from the dashboard to the wiper stalk, and wider LE-type tires for the DX trim (from ). 1985 cars received gas-charged front shock absorbers and stiffer rear springs, an anti-theft alarm system was now optional on both grades, automatic became an option for the diesel, the DX added a standard tilt steering wheel, and the LE models offered an optional electronic instrument cluster. Other revisions for this model year were a revised powered brake system and new cloth seat and door trim for LEs.

For Australia, the Camry range—based on the Vista front styling—was limited to a single-grade GLi liftback variant between April 1983 and April 1987. Sold as an upmarket alternative to the locally produced Toyota Corona (T140), the sole powertrain offered was the gasoline 2.0-liter 2S-EL engine with  coupled with the five-speed manual or four-speed automatic transmission. Optional extras included powering steering, air conditioning, electric moonroof, power doors and windows, plus an upgraded stereo.

Europe and the United Kingdom received both body variants when released there in mid 1984—these were available in the gasoline DX trim (1.8- 1S-L) and 2.0-liter GLi (2S-EL) or the GLD turbo diesel (1.8- 1C-TL in early models; later models upgraded to the 2.0-liter 2C-TL).

V20 (1986–1992) 

The second generation, V20 series Camry went on sale during August 1986 in Japan. As with the previous series, there was again a parallel Vista model for the home market that Toyota released simultaneously. V20 Camry and Vista sedans continued with the four-door sedan configuration. For overseas markets, Toyota issued a station wagon for the first time. The Vista also launched with a four-door pillared hardtop sedan with unique body panels all-round in lieu of the liftback offered with the previous car—a body extended to the Camry in August 1988. Not intended for export, this hardtop body with few changes would later form the basis of the upscale but hastily conceived Lexus ES 250 produced for North American customers from June 1989 through to 1991. Toyota rushed the ES 250 as a stopgap measure to flesh out the fledgling Lexus lineup so as not to launch the flagship LS 400 as a stand-alone model.

The V20 Camry originated from a time at Toyota when considerable cost and attention to detail was engineered into its cars such as high-quality materials and build quality to transcend the competition. Sedans retained the V10's rear quarter glass with styling less angular than before. To appease export customers, styling lost some of its Japanese legacy in its transition to a more Americanized design, with a softer and sleeker silhouette. V20 also features headlamps and a grille that are sculptured into a gently curved hood that partially conceal the windscreen wipers, wind splitters up the ends of the windscreen, near-flush glass, and a third door seal to close the gap between the body and window frames. Body dimensions were largely unchanged from the previous model, including an identical wheelbase, although length increases . Basic sub-skin hardware is also closely related, including the platform and the fully independent suspension with a strut and a coil spring at each corner and an anti-roll bar at each end. Noise isolation is improved by mounting the rear suspension on a subframe akin to the Toyota Celica (T160) that had now switched to Camry-based mechanicals. As before, the braking package encompasses ventilated discs up front, conventional drums in the rear, upgraded to rear discs in some cars. The braking system has a tandem-type booster and diagonally divided hydraulic circuits. Wagons receive a load-sensing proportioning valve that grants greater braking pressure when laden and prevents wheel lockup under light payloads. Entry-level V20 wheel size increases from 13 to 14 inches.

All engines now use fuel injection exclusively and were common to Camry and Vista. Entry-level customers were offered the carry-over "Ci" 1.8-liter 1S-i (designated 1S-iLU in the V10) inline-four with five-speed manual or an automatic with four gears. Stepping up from this were the new 3S-FE and GT high-performance 3S-GE (designated 3S-GELU for V10s) 2.0-liter twin-cam four-cylinder cars. Turbo-diesel models were again limited to the 2C-T motor displacing 2.0 liters (labeled 2C-TL for V10s). Transmission were either a five-speed manual or an electronically controlled automatic with four gears. When launched in Japan, the V20 series Camry (sedan only) offered the following trim levels: LT, XT, XT Saloon, ZE, ZT, ZX, and GT. For the Vista sedan, Toyota offered: VC, VL, VE, VR, and VX. Hardtop versions comprised: VE, VR, VX, and GT. Flagship models of the Japanese specification Camry sedan, the Camry Prominent and Prominent G arrived in April 1987 with the 2.0-liter 1VZ-FE V6 engine, a protruding chrome grille, larger North American-type bumpers, wood grain interior highlights, an electric seat function, plus electronic instrument cluster. Full-time four-wheel-drive became an option in October 1987 with select 3S-FE manual variants (VL Extra, VR); automatics equipped with an electronic front- and rear-wheel torque distribution optimizer followed in August 1988. The Vista was not available with the V6, but in April 1987, the special edition Vista VL Extra sedan and hardtop arrived, followed by the Etoile in August and again in January 1989; limited edition Etoile V cars were offered in September 1989 and January 1990. Toyota discontinued the Vista VC in December 1989 and released a special edition VX Limited in May 1989 and then again for January 1990. When the Camry Prominent hardtop variant arrived in August 1988, it offered base, G, and E-Type levels of trim alongside a new sedan-only Camry Lumière. Also in August 1988, a diesel version of the Vista hardtop made its debut, and the 1.8-liter gasoline engine was upgraded to the twin-cam 4S-Fi specification. Special editions for the Camry comprised: Lumière S sedan (January 1989), Prominent X hardtop (May 1989), Lumière G sedan (June 1989), and XT Saloon Special sedan (January 1990).

North American market V20 series Camry sedan and wagons came to the market in late 1986 for the 1987 model year. Toyota Motor Manufacturing Kentucky, the first wholly owned Toyota plant in the US, began producing the Camry in May 1988. The country of manufacture can be found by looking at the first character of the VIN; a Camry manufactured in Japan has a VIN starting with "J", a model made in the US starts with "4" and a model made in Australia starts with "6". All Camry station wagons for the United States originated from Japan, while sedans were a mix of Japanese built and American built, with the ratio of American-built sedans increasing yearly. Three trim levels of the V20 Camry were made: the unbadged base model, the DX, and the LE. The four-wheel-drive Camry, dubbed All-Trac was introduced for 1988 and a 2.5-liter V6 engine was also added as an option, though notably not in combination with the All-Trac option. The V6 was fuel-injected with 24 valves, and dual overhead camshafts. The 1989 model year saw the Camry’s mid-life update which included new front and rear bumper covers that were one piece instead of two, new taillight design, along with a few interior styling updates. The 1990 model year saw a slight upgrade in horsepower for V6 models, from 153 to 156. North American 1990 Camrys built from February 1990-August 1990 also saw another refresh that included Toyota’s new logo introduced that year onto the front grille. Color-keyed door handles and grille also appeared on DX and LE models, along with a new ignition chime. In 1989, anti-lock brakes became optional on the LE V6 sedan and wagon, and LE All-Trac.

1991 model year Camrys began production in August 1990, and can be identified by a newly redesigned front valence panel under the front bumper. In addition, the DX model gains new standard color keyed bumpers, new interior cloth that replaces the older tweed, and new hubcap designs on both DX and LE models.

Toyota Australia released the second generation Camry in April 1987. Local manufacture of the V20 had begun earlier in February at its recently acquired Australian Motor Industries facility at Port Melbourne, Victoria as a replacement for the Toyota Corona (T140) and the Camry before it. Four-cylinder engine production and panel-stamping was undertaken at Toyota's Altona, Victoria plant, all part of a model localization and factory upgrades investment totaling . In fact, it was the first Camry made outside Japan, and is notable for being the most localized Toyota Australia product thus far with a lead time of less than six months, the shortest yet between start of Japanese and Australian manufacture. Higher levels of specification were fitted with the locally built 2.0-liter 3S-FE motor, but the imported 1.8-liter 1S-i unit distinguished base SE and CS cars. Both sedans and wagons were offered and either engine offered standard five-speed manual transmission, upgradeable to the four-speed automatic. Features standard at the base level SE comprised: AM/FM radio, centre console storage compartment, remote fuel filler release, intermittent windscreen wipers, digital clock. CS cars added a tilt steering column to which the CS-X adds a key lock warning system. The CS driver's seat has front height adjustment; the CS-X's front and rear height adjustment. The CS gets a two speaker AM/FM radio cassette player; the CS-X a four-speaker system and automatic electric antenna, plus central locking, variable intermittent wipers and center rear arm rest. The sedan-only Ultima grade gains power windows, cruise control, automatic transmission as standard, velour trim, and a nine-stage graphic equalizer for the audio system. A fleet-focused Executive pack based on the SE arrived in May 1988, adding automatic transmission, power steering, and air conditioning. In June 1988, the 2.5-liter V6 was introduced, being an imported fully optioned model from Japan sold in limited numbers and distinguished from local four-cylinder cars by its unique bumpers and trim. Coinciding with the August 1989 facelift, the 2.0-liter 3S-FC engine with carburetor superseded the imported 1.8. The updates brought minor adjustments inside and out, including improved suspension, steering, and headlights. In May 1991, Toyota made the fuel-injected 3S-FE version standard upon the carbureted engine's deletion, and the CS trim level became CSi. Coinciding with this change, power steering became standard fitment and Toyota Australia refreshed badging, including the attachment of the new corporate logo consisting of three overlapping ellipses to form the letter "T". With the May 1991 update, the Ultima models gained a CD player, the first Australian-built car to offer this. Towards the end of the series, special editions were released, starting with the Spirit of February 1991. Then in September 1992, value-added CSi Limited and Olympic Spirit cars came onto the scene. Australian production ended in late November 1992, in time for production of the XV10 to commence on 2 December. The Used Car Safety Ratings, published in 2008 by the Monash University Accident Research Centre, found that V20 Camry models provide an "average" (3/5 stars) level of occupant safety protection in the event of an accident.

Holden Apollo (JK, JL)

The Holden Apollo, a rebadged variant to the Toyota Camry, retailed in Australia alongside the facelifted Camry V20 series from August 1989. Production had started in July. This model sharing occurred due to the United Australian Automobile Industries (UAAI) joint venture between Toyota Australia and General Motors-Holden's starting in 1987 that resulted in model sharing between both automakers from August 1989. Known as the JK series, the Apollo differentiated itself by way of a redesigned grille, rehashed tail lamps and other minor trim items. This rebranding scheme was the result of the Button car plan, introduced in May 1984 to rationalise and make the Australian automotive industry more competitive on a global scale by means of reducing import tariffs. Offered in sedan and wagon guises, Apollo replaced the Camira.

Powertrains were verbatim of the Camry, with the 3S-FC for the entry-level SL, and higher-end SLX and SLE models graced with the 3S-FE engine. An SLX option pack, known as the Executive was also available. The SL opened up the Apollo range with remote exterior mirrors, intermittent windscreen wipers, heated rear screen demister, remote trunk release for sedans and fuel filler door, a two-speaker radio cassette player and tinted side and rear glass. SLX variants were distinguished by their full wheel covers, as opposed to the SL model's steel wheels with centre caps. The Executive variant was not a stand-alone model, but an option pack for the SLX, adding power steering and automatic transmission. SLE equipment included the four-wheel disc brakes, variable intermittent windscreen wipers, a four-speaker stereo, body-coloured bumpers, dual odometers, automatic headlamp cut-off system, velour seat upholstery, centre back-seat armrest, power antenna, central locking with illuminated driver's door lock and front map lamps. As per the Camry, in May 1991, the EFI version of the engine was made standard.

In August 1991, there was a small Apollo facelift, given the designation JL, with an altered model range. The SL and SLX continued, with the SLE now available only as a sedan. The Executive pack was now no longer offered, and a sports version, dubbed GS was introduced in both body variants. Equipment levels mostly mirrored the previous JK, although the SLX was now similar in specification to the discontinued Executive and the GS to the JK SLE, albeit without standard automatic transmission. GS specification cars also added body stripes, red highlights, a tachometer and upgraded audio. Appearance-wise, the JK and JL are very similar, with the JL's grille treated with bolder chrome highlighting and slightly altered tail lamps on sedans. The XV10 Camry-based JM Apollo replaced the JL in March 1993.

Model codes

V30 (1990–1994) 

Introduced exclusively to Japan in July 1990, the Camry V30 carried forward the four-door sedan and a differently styled hardtop sedan. Like before, either shape could be had in a Vista branded variety with revised styling. Both bodies would also form the basis of enlarged wide-body XV10 versions from September 1991, aimed primarily at international markets. The V30 remained smaller than the XV10 to offer buyers a vehicle within the "five-number" registration category concerning exterior dimensions and engine displacement for Japanese vehicle size regulations. The rules required a body width under , length under , and engines at or below 2,000 cc. Sedans in the wide-body format would sell overseas as the Camry XV10—identical to the smaller V30 in most respects except for the front- and rear-end styling grafted to an otherwise unchanged body and interior. Hardtop sedans would engender the luxury Lexus ES 300 (XV10), which again would couple the existing side profile with rehashed front, rear, and interior designs. The export-oriented ES 300 would sell as the Toyota Windom in Japan.

Penned by Osamu Shikado, the V30's design is much rounder when compared to the V20 series. Rather than the V20's six-window greenhouse, the V30 sedans have a four-part setup with integrated window sashes. Up front, the sedan's curved headlamps converge with a slimline grille insert; hardtops get a thinner front assembly with narrower lights, and the C-pillar is raked more sharply. Base cars gain full body-colour coding of peripheral exterior components.

The four-wheel strut/coil suspension carried over from the V20, although as option on high-end front-drive trims, Toyota added a wheel-stroke-sensitive Toyota Electronic Modulated Suspension (TEMS) and speed sensitive four-wheel steering. The available powerplants were three twin-cam inline-four engines—the 1.8-liter 4S-FE, plus the 3S-FE and higher-performance 3S-GE 2.0-liter units. Toyota also offered the 2.0-liter 2C-T turbo-diesel inline-four known from the previous generations, and for the flagship Camry Prominent only, the 2.0-liter 1VZ-FE gasoline V6. In May 1991 a 2.5-liter V6 engine also became available on the Camry Prominent, while the earlier 2-liter V6 became the "Prominent E".

An updated model appeared in July 1992. The scope of changes ranged from a new, larger grille and a revised air conditioning unit. At the same time the ZX Touring package appeared in place of the GT, which Toyota discontinued in conjunction with the sporting 3S-GE engine option. The 2.0 V6 engine was removed from the lineup at the same time, leaving the 2.5-liter unit as the only offering in the Camry Prominent.

V40 (1994–1998) 

The Camry V40 appeared in July 1994 exclusively for the Japanese market. The Toyota Vista twin continued on, although the Camry Prominent hardtop was no longer offered; only the Vista was available as a hardtop. As before in previous generations, the Camry was exclusive to Toyota Corolla Store, while the Vista was only available at Toyota Vista Store locations.

V40 continued to be built around the  x  length-width bracket, legacy of a Japanese taxation law. The car is  taller than its predecessor.

Engines for the V40 were a 1.8-liter (4S-FE type) and 2.0-liter (3S-FE type), and a 2.2-liter turbo-diesel (3C-T type). At launch only the 2.0-liter model was available in all-wheel drive mode, although afterwards the 2.2-liter turbodiesel could be optioned with this system.

Toyota updated the V40 in June 1996. In the update anti-lock brakes and dual air bags became standard equipment. After 1998, the Japanese market Camry and international Camry became in-line with each other, with the Vista taking over the V30 and V40 Camry roles.

V50 (1998–2003) 

The V50 generation was not available as a Camry—only as a Vista—as a sedan, plus a station wagon called Vista Ardeo. 1.8 L and 2.0 L engines were available. The interior features a center instrument panel/navigation display.

Vista V50 is significant because it's one of the first fruits of Toyota's company-wide platform renewal efforts known as the MC. Studies for new front-wheel drive (FWD) platform and packaging layout began in 1993 and appeared on market in December 1997 in the Toyota Prius, but the Vista is the first mass-production, FWD Toyota with a new platform. Toyota claims this is the first true redesign and rethink of its FWD platforms since the 1982 Camry/Vista. With this platform, Toyota trades the rear MacPherson struts for a torsion beam axle setup. A double-wishbone setup is available for all-wheel drive. Toyota also flipped the engine orientation so that the intake manifold is in front, improving space efficiency.

Production for the Vista ended in September 2003, as Toyota prepared to rename the Vista dealers as the Toyota Netz dealership network. The move to simplify Toyota's dealership came in light of the pending Lexus launch in Japan, planned for August 2005. In April 2005 the process was complete and all Vista dealers became Netz dealers. In October 2003, the Vista was replaced by the second generation Avensis.

Wide-body

XV10 (1991–1996) 

Toyota replaced the compact V20 Camry with the Japanese market-only V30 series in 1990. However, international markets such as Australia and North America received a widened version of the V30, known as the XV10 series. Particularly in the United States, this narrower model was seen as compromised, thus limiting its sales potential. As a result, the "wide-body" mid-size Camry (XV10) released to North America in 1991 was developed from early 1988 and the final design frozen later that year. It was with the XV10 that Toyota upgraded the Camry's status to its second "world car" after the Corolla, with exports starting from Australia to Southeast Asia. Japan also received the wider XV10 model, although it was sold under the Toyota Scepter name there. Toyota chose the name "Scepter" as a reference to the Camry/Crown naming tradition, as a "scepter" is a symbolic ornamental staff held by a ruling monarch, a prominent item of royal regalia.

A notable point of the "Wide body" SXV10 Camry is the influence of engineering developed from the launch of Lexus and the LS400, which came to market just a few years prior to its public debut. The kinship to Lexus models in engineering standards (such as CMM and GD&T development standards) and tolerances on the SXV10 is often perceived to be closer than any prior or latter iterations of the Camry. In an interview with Automotive News, Chris Hostetter, group vice president for Toyota NA, admitted that the 1992 Camry was considered by many company insiders to be more of a "Lexus product" than most Toyota badge cars, going on to mention that it borrowed technologies such as hydraulically powered cooling fans directly developed from the ES300. However, the Lexus standards of the SXV10 created a division in product development philosophies in the company. Also according to Automotive News, some company insiders considered it too upscale for its price point and the market segment it was set to compete within (mid-sized, mid-segment).

It was Robert McCurry in conjunction with Dave Illingworth and Jim Press, who, with great initial opposition from the Japanese executives, convinced the Japanese company that the 1992 Camry be re-designed, enlarged, and shaped to resemble a scaled-down LS400 with a more affordable FWD format, to help establish the reputation of Lexus, which at the time was still in its infancy and lacked brand heritage. The intensive platform and component sharing with the 1992 ES300 allowed Toyota to leverage costs better to allow the SXV10 Camry's high level of specification at a reasonable price. The 1992 Camry also took more resemblance to the LS400 in the sloped roofline, wide C pillar and framed windows, where as the ES300 featured a hardtop design with an upgraded/stiffened suspension. However, the LS400 and the SXV10 Camry featured no sharing of powertrain layout nor design. Many insiders of Toyota argued even after critical acclaim that the SXV10 Camry overlapped too greatly with Lexus, even though Chris Hostetter, current vice president of advanced technology research at Toyota, believed the model had to be developed to develop buyers who would become interested in Lexus. This division as well as cost-cutting led to the Camry and Lexus line to become more distinctive, as the Camry became a more economical, affordable, spacious sedan typical of the segment.

The smaller V30 Camry varied in other areas besides the size. Although the underpinnings, doors and fenders, and overall basic design cues were common between the two cars, the smaller Camry sported harder, more angular front- and rear-end styling treatment, with the wide-body model presenting a more curvaceous silhouette. This was a departure from the V20 generation Camry which, although had many more rounded panels than the V10 series, was nevertheless generally slab-sided in shape. A two-door Camry coupé was added to compete with the Honda Accord coupé. However, the Camry Coupé was never popular and was dropped in 1996. A two-door Camry would not be reintroduced until 1999, with the Toyota Camry Solara.

The Japanese V30 model was replaced by the Camry V40 in 1994, however, this was also a Japan-only model. International markets instead retained the wider XV10 until it was replaced by the XV20 in 1996. The V40 and XV20 models were sold alongside one another in the Japanese market until 1998. At this time, the Vista V50 took the place of the V40, ending the period of separate Camrys for the Japanese and international markets.

The XV10, at its most basic level, offered a 2.2-liter 5S-FE four-cylinder engine, up from 2.0 liters in the V20 and V30 Camrys. Power and displacement increases were also received for the V6 engine. An all-new aluminium 1MZ-FE V6 debuted in North American models from 1993 for the 1994 model year, with other markets retaining the 3VZ-FE V6.

In Australia, the V6 engine Camry was badged "Camry Vienta" when launched in 1993, later becoming the Toyota Vienta in 1995. In South Africa, the XV10 Camry was manufactured by Toyota SA in Durban from 1992 to 2001, offering both the 2.2-liter and 3.0-liter engines, as well as a 2.0-liter engine derived from the Celica. Only a sedan configuration was available. These were also marketed and sold into Namibia, Botswana and Zimbabwe.

A variant of the UK market V6 model - detuned to run on 91 rather than 95 octane unleaded petrol - was launched in New Zealand in 1991. These Japanese-built models were replaced with an Australian-made line, with unique New Zealand specification, in 1993 at which point the 2.2-liter I4 was offered as well.

XV20 (1996–2002) 

In late 1991, development on the XV20 commenced after launch of the XV10 under the 415T program. Design work was frozen in early 1994 and later launched in the United States in September 1996 and Japan in December 1996. It continued as a sedan and station wagon (called the Camry Gracia in Japan), though the wagon was not sold in the United States. This was the first generation where it was sold in Japan as the Daihatsu Altis, replacing the Daihatsu Applause.

In August 1999 for the 2000 model year, the sedan models received a mid-model upgrade to the front and rear fascias, but remained otherwise similar to the 1997 to 1999 models.

In the United States, the Camry SE was dropped and the base model was renamed the CE for the 1997 model year. Both the LE and the XLE trims were carried over from the previous series. All trim levels were available with either the 2.2-liter I4 or the 3.0-liter V6 engine except the Solara SLE, which was only available with the V6. A coupe was added in 1999, and then a convertible form in 2000. In contrast to the coupe from the XV10 generation Camrys, the new two-door cars were given a separate nameplate Camry Solara, or simply Solara. They were also a significant styling departure from the sedan. The Solara was available in SE and SLE trims, corresponding roughly to the sedan's LE and XLE trims.

Power was increased slightly to  SAE for the 5S-FE 2.2 L I4 and  SAE for the 1MZ-FE V6. Manual transmissions (model: S51) were only available on the CE trim level, LE V6, and any Solara model. Camrys and Solaras equipped with the 5S-FE 4 cylinder engine and appropriate trim package received the S51 manual transmission, while those equipped with the 1MZ-FE 6 cylinder engine received the E153 manual transmission.

XV30 (2001–2006) 

Regular
Released in September 2001 for the 2002 model year, Toyota released the Camry XV30 series as a larger sedan, but without a station wagon for the first time. The wagon's demise occurred due to its sales erosion to minivans and crossover SUVs.

Toyota redesigned this series from the ground up for the first time since the V30 and XV10. Through efficiency gains such as increased computerization, and by having the XV30 ride on the K platform introduced with the Toyota Highlander (XU20) of 2000, Toyota expedited the XV30 production development stage to 26 months, down from 36 months with the XV20. As a consequence, Toyota claimed the XV30 to have cost 30 percent less to design and develop than its predecessor. XV30 also had increased parts content over the XV20, but did not cost any more to manufacture.

Until the 2003 model year, the Camry Solara remained on the XV20 series chassis, and received only minor styling upgrades to the front and rear ends. However, the Solara did receive the same 2.4-liter 2AZ-FE I4 engine that was available on the Camry sedan. The US received three engine options, a  2.4-liter inline-four, a  3.0-liter V6, and a  3.3-liter version of the same. The 3.3-liter was only available for the Camry's sportier "SE" model.

Prestige
Compared to the international version with a less conservative design (styled by Hiroyuki Metsugi, approved 1999), the Southeast Asian and Taiwanese "prestige" Camry had a different distinctive design with more chrome, larger head lamps and tail lamps and a general greater emphasis on its width.

XV40 (2006–2013) 

Regular

This generation of Camry saw even greater differentiation between "regular" model sold internationally (including Japan) and the "prestige" Camry sold in the rest of Asia. The regular Camry, fitted with four-cylinder engines sold alongside the V6-engined prestige Camry in Oceania and the Middle East as the Toyota Aurion. Between 2006 and 2010, the regular Camry was also rebadged as the Daihatsu Altis model, which sold alongside the Camry in Japan. The Daihatsu differed only in badging, with no cosmetic changes.

The XV40 Camry was introduced at the 2006 North American International Auto Show alongside a hybrid version and went on sale in March 2006 for the 2007 model year.

Power comes from a choice of four and six-cylinder engines. The 2.4-liter 2AZ-FE I4 engine was carried over and produced . It came with a five-speed manual or five-speed automatic transmission. The 3.5-liter 2GR-FE V6 in contrast came with a new six-speed automatic and produced .

The Camry was facelifted in early 2009 for the 2010 model year with a redesigned fascia, taillights, and an all-new 2.5-liter 2AR-FE four-cylinder engine with a new six-speed automatic transmission. Power locks, stability control, traction control and tires were also made standard for 2010. A six speed manual transmission was available on the base model.

The XV40 series Camry is the first in which the Camry has been available as a gasoline/electric hybrid.

Prestige

The Asian market Camry features different front and rear styling, plus a revised interior. In Asia, the Camry occupied a higher end of the market, priced just below entry-level German luxury models. The Asian Camry lineup includes a 3.5-liter V6 model and is sold as the Toyota Aurion (XV40) in Australia, competing against large Australian sedans like the Ford Falcon and Holden Commodore.

XV50 (2011–2019) 
 

Regular
The XV50 Camry was produced from 21 August 2011, introduced on 23 August 2011, and began U.S. sales in September 2011. The interior received a major restyling, while the exterior received all-new sheet metal and more angular styling.

The US Camry carried over three different engine choices from the previous model. Power output has been increased mostly by switching to electro-hydraulic power steering. The trim levels include the L, LE, SE, XLE, SE V6, XLE V6, Hybrid LE, Hybrid XLE and for 2014 a Hybrid SE model. All models except for the hybrids are standard with six-speed automatic transmissions. For the first time, the manual transmission was not available. Hybrids are equipped with an eCVT transmission. The SE model gets paddle shifters, and a stiffer suspension. The new model has increased fuel economy due to lighter weight, a sleeker body, and low rolling-resistance tires.

A major facelift released to North America in April 2014 for the 2015 model year updated most of the exterior panels.

The US-built Toyota Camry took the top spot in 2015 and 2016 as the most American-made car with over 75 percent of its parts and manufacturing coming from the United States.

Prestige
In this generation, the Camry line-up for the Japanese domestic market was reduced to being just a single variant (hybrid only). The Japanese market will now share the same Camry model as the Asian market "prestige" Camry—a design also adopted by the Toyota Aurion (XV50), albeit with minor visual changes. The Brazilian market also carries the Prestige variant instead of the one sold in North America (only in the 3.5L V6 configuration). Prior to the XV50, the Japanese and Brazilian markets wide-body Camry were similar to the US models. The "prestige" Camry was discontinued in Southeast Asia and India in late 2018, but continued to be sold in Vietnam until April 2019.

XV70 (2017–present) 
 

The latest Camry, which is the eighth generation of the global Camry model, and known as the XV70, was introduced at the January 2017 North American International Auto Show. It was launched in Japan on 10 July 2017, and in Australia on 21 November 2017. North American production started in June 2017, and sales began in late July 2017. It is built on GA-K platform.

Engine choices include a base 2.5 L inline four-cylinder (I4) that now produces  in base form ( when equipped with the optional quad exhaust), the same 2.5 L inline four-cylinder (I4) engine with an electric motor (Hybrid) that produces , or the top-of-the-line 3.5 L V6 that produces . In some markets the old 2.5 L 2AR-FE engine is carried over from the previous generation which produces .

The only major components shared with the previous generation are the Toyota emblem on the front grille and rear trunk lid.

Sales 
Competing with mainstream and more affordable models in Western markets, for other export markets in Asia and Latin America, the Camry is seen as a luxury car where it sells strongly (and serves as Toyota's flagship vehicle along with the Land Cruiser). In the United States, except for 2001, the Camry was the best-selling passenger car from 1997 through 2020. Despite international success, and early success in Japan, the later wide-body models have been a low-volume model in its home market. However, since the introduction of the XV50 Camry in 2011, sales of the wide-body models in Japan have resurged, thanks, in large part, to the inclusion of Toyota's Hybrid Synergy Drive system.

The Camry is also a prolific seller within Australia. The Camry has profited within its medium-sized class, where it has been its best selling since 1993, beating traditional competitors including the Mazda 6, as well as contemporary ones in that of the Ford Mondeo and Skoda Superb. The Middle East, as well as Eastern Europe, each have seen the Camry sell well, with Western Europe previously having small amounts exported.

Hybrid sales

References

Bibliography

External links 

  (global)

 
Camry
Euro NCAP executive cars
Mid-size cars
Compact cars
Front-wheel-drive vehicles
All-wheel-drive vehicles
Coupés
Hatchbacks
Partial zero-emissions vehicles
Sedans
Station wagons
Cars introduced in 1982
Vehicles with four-wheel steering
1990s cars
2000s cars
2010s cars
2020s cars